The Serbian Museum of Corfu (meaning "Serbian house") is a museum in Corfu, Greece.

Exhibition
The museum houses rare exhibits about the Serbian soldiers' tragic fate during the First World War. The remnants of the Serbian Army of about 150,000 soldiers together with their government in exile, found refuge and shelter in Corfu, following the collapse of the Serbian Front as a result of the Austro-Hungarian attack of the 6 October 1915. 

Exhibits include photographs from the three years stay of the Serbians in Corfu, together with other exhibits such as uniforms, arms and ammunition of the Serbian army, Serbian regimental flags, religious artifacts, surgical tools, and other decorations of the Kingdom of Serbia.

See also
 Great Retreat (Serbian)

References

External links
Municipality of Corfu

Museums in Corfu
History museums in Greece
Military and war museums in Greece
World War I museums
Greece–Serbia relations
Serbia in World War I
Greece in World War I
Diplomatic missions in Greece